Lee Boon Yang (born 1 October 1947) is a Singaporean former politician who served as Minister for Information, Communications and the Arts between 2003 and 2009, Minister for Manpower between 1992 and 2003, and Minister for Defence between 1994 and 1995. A former member of the governing People's Action Party (PAP), he was the Member of Parliament (MP) representing the Jalan Besar ward of Jalan Besar GRC between 1984 and 2011. 

Lee retired from politics in 2011, and served as Chairman of Singapore Press Holdings between 2011 and 2022.

Education
Lee was awarded a Colombo Plan scholarship to study veterinary science at the University of Queensland, where he graduated with a Bachelor of Veterinary Science degree in 1971. 

In 2015, Lee was conferred an honorary doctorate by the University of Queensland.

Career
Lee began his career as a veterinary surgeon and worked as a research and development officer in the Singapore Government's Primary Production Department between 1972 and 1981. 

Lee subsequently worked at the US Feed Grains Council as Assistant Regional Director and later Senior Project Manager for Primary Industries Enterprise between 1981 and 1984.

Political career
Lee was first elected into Parliament in 1984.

He was subsequently appointed Parliamentary Secretary in 1985, and went on to hold positions in the Ministry of the Environment, Ministry of Communications and Information, Ministry of Finance and the Ministry of Home Affairs.

Lee was appointed Minister in the Prime Minister's Office in 1991. He served as Minister for Labour between 1992 and 2003. He also served as Minister for Defence between 1994 and 1995 concurrently. He was subsequently appointed Minister for Information, Communications and the Arts in 2003, where he served until 2009.

Lee resigned from the Cabinet in 2009 but remained as a Member of Parliament on the backbenches until his retirement from politics in 2011.

Post-political career
Lee was appointed Chairman of the Board of Keppel Corporation in 2009, after resigning from the Cabinet, where he served until 2021. 

He also served as Chairman of Singapore Press Holdings between 2011 and 2022, before he was succeeded by Christopher Lim.

Personal life
Lee has an elder brother Lee Boon Wang, a landscape painter and a sister Lee Boon Ngan.

Lee is married to Yap Mee Mee and they have a daughter.

References

	

Ministers for Defence of Singapore
Members of the Parliament of Singapore
People's Action Party politicians
Singaporean people of Teochew descent
University of Queensland alumni
Living people
1947 births
Communications ministers of Singapore
Labour ministers of Singapore
Singaporean chairpersons of corporations